Ron Carpenter (born 1950 in Dorking) is an English typographer. He was trained as a cartographer and later became a typeface designer. He works for independent font foundry, Dalton Maag.

Early life 

Carpenter grew up in the village of Brockham, Surrey, as the younger of two brothers born to George and Audrey Carpenter. He attended Brockham Village School before finishing his studies at Sondes Place School.

Career

Out of school at the age of 16, Carpenter trained as a cartographer. His work involved the surveying for and hand drawing of Ordnance Survey maps. During this time he developed an interest in typography and obtained a job at Monotype.

In 1986, Carpenter designed and developed the font, Calisto MT, an old style serif. The Calisto face is intended to function as both a text and display face.

After leaving Monotype in 1992, he worked for a time as a freelance typographer before joining Bruno Maag in his start-up company Dalton Maag.

Personal life
In 1979—at a Christmas Eve party in the local Brockham Village Hall—he was introduced to the sister of one of his friends, Julie. After a lengthy engagement he married Julie in 1990; together they moved into a flat in Reigate, before buying a house shortly before their first and only son, Morgan was born in 1992.

Fonts
Carpenter has designed the following type fonts: Cantoria (1986), Calisto, Amasis (1992), Dante (1993). He has also designed Aktiv Grotesk, Co, Kings Caslon, Lexia, Plume, Stroudley and Viato as part of his design work for Dalton Maag.

References

External links
International Typeface Corporation web page on Calisto

English typographers and type designers
English cartographers
1950 births
Living people
People from Dorking